Jamie Delgado and Lovro Zovko were the defending champions, but decided not to participate.
Frederik Nielsen and Ken Skupski won the title, defeating Federico Gaio and Purav Raja 6–4, 7–5 in the final.

Seeds

  Frederik Nielsen /  Ken Skupski (champions)
  Federico Delbonis /  Gerard Granollers (first round)
  Kenny de Schepper /  Fabrice Martin (semifinals)
  Ruben Bemelmans /  Igor Sijsling (semifinals)

Draw

Draw

References
 Main Draw

Guzzini Challenger - Doubles
Guzzini Challenger